Jack Jones Sings is an album by Pop vocalist Jack Jones. It was arranged and conducted by Ralph Carmichael. Doug Talbert played piano.

Track listing
"A Day in the Life of a Fool" (Manha de Carnaval from Black Orpheus) (Luiz Bonfá, Antônio Maria) (2:20)
"Autumn Leaves" (Joseph Kosma, Jacques Prévert, Johnny Mercer) (3:19)
"Somewhere There's Someone" (Dave Heisler, Charles Nathan) (2:16)
"Watch What Happens" (from The Umbrellas of Cherbourg) (Michel Legrand, Norman Gimbel) (2:43)
"People Will Say We're in Love" (Richard Rodgers, Oscar Hammerstein II) (1:49)
"Love After Midnight" (Bert Kaempfert, Joe Seneca, Herbert Rehbein) (2:40)
"Somewhere, My Love" (Lara's Theme from Dr. Zhivago) (Maurice Jarre, Paul Francis Webster) (2:20)
"The Shining Sea" (from The Russians Are Coming) (Johnny Mandel, Peggy Lee) (3:16)
"The Face I Love" (Ray Gilbert, Carlos Pingarilho, Marcos Valle, Paulo Sérgio Valle) (1:49)
"Street of Dreams" (Victor Young, Sam M. Lewis) (2:31)
"The Snows of Yesteryear" (Fred Talbert, Paul Francis Webster) (2:49)
"I Don't Care Much" (John Kander, Fred Ebb) (2:24)

This may well be Jack's best album. It was released in 1966 when he was at his peak and although it wasn't one of his biggest sellers, the singing is superb.  The selection of songs is perfect for Jack and some of his versions are definitive in the minds of many. For example, he does "I Don't Care Much" (from Cabaret) in a way that conveys the gist of the song better than even some of the original cast versions. Other highlights include "A Day in the Life of a Fool", "Watch What Happens", and "Street of Dreams".

1966 albums
Jack Jones (singer) albums
Albums conducted by Ralph Carmichael
Albums arranged by Ralph Carmichael
Kapp Records albums